Latin culture may refer to:
Culture of the Latins, an ancient Italic people
Culture of ancient Rome, descended from the culture of the Latins
Latin, the language of the Latins, and the lingua franca of Ancient Rome and early medieval Western Europe
Latin literature, literature written in Latin
Classics, the study of Latin and Ancient Greek literature
Romance-speaking world, areas of the world where Romance languages (which descended from Latin) are spoken
Latin America, areas of the Americas where Spanish, Portuguese and French are spoken

See also
Italic peoples
Romance languages